Markel Robles Zugadi (born 12 June 1979 in Lekeitio, Biscay) is a Spanish former professional footballer who played as a defensive midfielder.

External links

1979 births
Living people
Spanish footballers
Footballers from the Basque Country (autonomous community)
Association football midfielders
Segunda División players
Segunda División B players
Tercera División players
SD Eibar footballers
SD Lemona footballers
Real Unión footballers
SD Leioa players
Arenas Club de Getxo footballers